Kinesoft Development Corporation was a British video game development company founded by Peter Sills in 1991. Mark Achler joined the  company in 1994 to serve as president.  Along with Director of Technology, Andrew Glaister, Sills developed the concept which became known as Exodus, a video-game development environment for Windows 95.  Andrew Glaister took this concept and developed it.

Exodus caught the attention of IBM, Intel, Sega, and Microsoft.  Microsoft then used the basic concepts and their relationship with Kinesoft to develop a new set of technologies called DirectX which now forms the basis of all gaming under Windows. Subsequently, Kinesoft's port of Pitfall: The Mayan Adventure was the first commercial game release for Windows 95 and was touted by Bill Gates at that year's COMDEX tradeshow as the launch of the new DirectX technologies for Windows 95, but the game itself does not use DirectX technology. Other Exodus platform games included Windows ports of Earthworm Jim and Gex.

In 1995-05-25, Kinesoft and Softbank entered into the "Game Porting Agreement". Under the terms of that agreement, Softbank was to provide Kinesoft with a certain number of console games to be "ported" to a PC platform; the "porting" involves translating pre-existing video games from the console platform to the personal computer platform. The games were to be published by GAMEBANK Corporation, a joint venture company established by SoftBank and Microsoft to bring console titles to Windows 95 for the Japanese marketplace by using its unique talents and tool-sets to convert existing Sega Genesis titles. In the US, some of these ports were published by Interplay. These ports were later expanded to include Nintendo and some early Sony PlayStation titles as well.

In 1999-11-17, Kinesoft Development filed a lawsuit in US District Court for the Northern District of Illinois, Eastern Division against its SoftBank Holdings Inc. and SoftBank Corporation for breach of SoftBank's obligations under a previous settlement agreement, which alleged violation of the 1997 Agreement where Softbank was required to pay $10 million between 1997-06-12 and 1998-10-01, which had been made after Kinesoft had sued Softbank for breach of the Game Porting Agreement, which Softbank had admitted that it had not provided Kinesoft with the agreed upon number of games that had led to the 1997 Agreement where Kinesoft released all claims against Softbank Corporation under the Game Porting Agreement. The case was to go forward in a trial set in 2001-06-01. Eventually it dissolved soon after the trial in 2001.

Products
In addition to games development, Kinesoft also released WinCD, a software CD player, and the film It's a Wonderful Life on CD-ROM for Windows 3.1.

References

External links
Archived company page
Peter Sills (CEO) at MobyGames

Video game development companies
Video game companies established in 1991
Defunct video game companies of the United Kingdom
1991 establishments in the United Kingdom